Frederick Stuart may refer to:
Frederick Stuart (British politician) (1751–1802), MP for Ayr Burghs and Buteshire
Frederick Stuart (Australian politician) (1879–1954), Australian member of New South Wales Legislative Assembly
Freddie Stuart, English actor in the 2002 Spooks episode "Traitor's Gate"

See also
Frederick Stuart Church (1842–1924), American drawing artist and illustrator
Frederick Stuart Greene (1870–1939), American Superintendent of New York State Public Works
Frederick Stewart (disambiguation)